Robert John Baker (26 July 1939 – 3 November 2021) was a British television and film writer. He was best known for working on the original run of Doctor Who, and for being a co-writer of the Wallace and Gromit films The Wrong Trousers, A Close Shave, Wallace & Gromit: The Curse of the Were-Rabbit and A Matter of Loaf and Death (in which the character Baker Bob is named after him).

Career
Baker and Dave Martin began writing for Harlech Television (HTV), the local ITV franchise. One of their earliest works was Thick As Thieves starring Leonard Rossiter.
 
Baker wrote for Doctor Who between 1971 and 1979. For all but the last of his contributions to this series (Nightmare of Eden), Baker collaborated with Dave Martin on numerous scripts including:

 The Claws of Axos (1971)
 The Mutants (1972)
 The Three Doctors (1972–1973)
 The Sontaran Experiment (1975)
 The Hand of Fear (1976)
 The Invisible Enemy (1977)
 Underworld (1978)
 The Armageddon Factor (1979)

Together, they were nicknamed "The Bristol Boys" by the Doctor Who production teams with whom they worked.

Baker and Martin devised for Doctor Who the robotic dog K-9 (created for The Invisible Enemy), the renegade Time Lord Omega (created for The Three Doctors, Doctor Who'''s 10th anniversary story) and the Axons. K-9 was originally intended to appear in one story only, but the BBC decided to make it a recurring character. Several of Baker's stories had elements of hard science not often found in Doctor Who, despite having been criticised for scientific inaccuracy. Prior to his death in 2021, Baker was the last surviving Doctor Who scriptwriter from the Third Doctor era.

Together with Martin, they also created fantasy television serials for children including Sky (1975).

Baker's other contributions to British television include Vision On animation with Laurie Booth, scripts for episodes of Shoestring and Bergerac. A new series featuring K9, K-9 created in Australia, aired in the UK and worldwide in 2009 and 2010.

Baker revealed on the DVD commentary for Nightmare of Eden that he contacted Russell T Davies about the possibility of writing for the 2005 revival of Doctor Who but was told in no uncertain terms that writers from the original series were not wanted, though K9 did appear in Doctor Who and The Sarah Jane Adventures under Russell T Davies.

In 2013, Baker wrote his autobiography entitled K9 Stole My Trousers with help from Laurie Booth. Later in 2015, he co-wrote with Paul M. Tams The Essential Book of K9'' which was crowd-funded on Indiegogo.

Personal life and death
Baker was married to Marie and had eight children and seven grandchildren. He resided in Stroud, Gloucestershire. He died on 3 November 2021, at the age of 82.

Writing credits

Television

Short films

Feature films

Books

Awards and nominations

References

External links
 
 

1939 births
2021 deaths
20th-century English screenwriters
21st-century British screenwriters
Writers from Bristol
English male writers
British writers
English television writers
British television writers
British male television writers
English autobiographers
Aardman Animations people